Seeq may refer to:

 Seeq Technology, a semiconductor company founded in 1981 and sold to LSI Corporation in 1999
 SEEQ Card, an electronic smartcard ticketing system used on TransLink (South East Queensland)
 A race in the fictional universe setting Ivalice
 Seeq Corporation, a data analytics software company founded in 2013

See also 
 SeeqPod